Philadelphia Hibernian, also known as Hibernian F.C., was an early twentieth century U.S. soccer team which played in Philadelphia, Pennsylvania.

History
According to Dave Litterer, “Philadelphia Hibernian was a perennial powerhouse in the Philadelphia leagues” when it entered the newly established Eastern Soccer League in 1909.  Hibernian finished fourth with a 1-3-1 record.  The league collapsed in 1910.  In 1911, Hibernian won the Pennsylvania Soccer League title.  They spent the 1914-1915 season in the American League of Philadelphia, going to the championship game where they lost 6-1 to Bethlehem Steel.  They continued to play in the ALP in 1915-1916.  They won the 1920-1921 Allied American Football Association title.

Record

Honors
American Cup
 Runner Up (1): 1911

League Championship
 Winner (1): 1913

Notable players
 Bart McGhee
 Thomas Swords

References

Defunct soccer clubs in Pennsylvania
H